TV1 is a Tanzanian television channel owned by Swedish company Modern Times Group known as MTG. They broadcast in Swahili language a mix of news, entertainment programs and purchased movies and TV shows. The channel is aimed at the 15–49 age group and has a particular focus on female viewers.

The channel was launched on 10 January 2014 becoming Tanzania's first advertising-funded television channel.

References

External links
Official website

Television stations in Tanzania
Television channels and stations established in 2014